USS Barite (IX-161), a Trefoil-class concrete barge designated an unclassified miscellaneous vessel, was the only ship of the United States Navy to be named for barite, a yellow or white crystalline mineral found in metallic veins, resembling marble. Her keel was laid down under a Maritime Commission contract (T. B7 D1, MC hull 1335) on 24 November 1943 at South San Francisco, California, by the Belair Shipyard of Barrett and Hilp. She was designated IX-161 on 7 February 1944, launched on 18 February 1944 sponsored by Mrs. S. C. Anderson, and delivered to the Navy at her builder's yard on 31 August 1944. She was placed in service the same day.

Service history

World War II, 1944–1945
Clearing that port four days later, again astern of Iroquois, the barge proceeded to Eniwetok.

Barite served at Ulithi as a floating lubricating oil facility into the spring of 1945, when the advent of the typhoon season made it imperative to shift Service Squadron (ServRon) 10's base to locales other than the Western Caroline Islands. Towed thence to Saipan on 15 May, she operated at that island, in the same capacity, as a unit of Service Division 101, a part of ServRon 10. Towed from Saipan on 30 June 1945, Barite was moved to Leyte, where she served through V-J Day.

Reassigned from Service Division 101 directly to the parent command, ServRon 10, on 28 August 1945, Barite remained in Philippine waters for the remainder of her naval service.

Post-war activities and sale, 1945–1951
Barite was taken out of service and delivered to the War Shipping Administration at Subic Bay on 5 August 1946, and her name was struck from the Naval Vessel Register on 15 August 1946. Subsequently sold to the China-based Asia Development Corporation, the ship was delivered to her purchaser on 23 April 1948. Lloyd's Register of Shipping carried the former Barite through the 1950-1951 editions, after which time she disappeared from the scene.

References

External links
 

 

Ships built in the San Francisco Bay Area
Trefoil-class concrete barges
1944 ships